This is a list of the 2011 Super League season results. Super League is the top-flight rugby league competition in the United Kingdom and France. The 2011 season started on 12 February, with the Magic Weekend at the Millennium Stadium in Cardiff, and ended on 8 October with the 2011 Super League Grand Final.

The 2011 Super League season consisted of two stages. The regular season was played over 27 round-robin fixtures, in which each of the fourteen teams involved in the competition played each other once at home and once away, as well as their Magic Weekend fixtures played over the first round of the season. In Super League XVI, a win was worth two points in the table, a draw worth one point apiece, and a loss yielded no points.

The league leaders at the end of the regular season received the League Leaders' Shield, but the Championship was decided through the second stage of the season—the play-offs. The top eight teams in the table contested to play in the 2011 Super League Grand Final, the winners of which, Leeds Rhinos, were crowned Super League XVI Champions.

Regular season

Round 1

Round 2

Round 3

Round 4

Round 5

Round 6

Round 7

Round 8

Round 9

Round 10

Round 11

Round 12

Round 13

Round 14

Round 15

Round 16

Round 17

Round 18

Round 19

Round 20

Round 21

Round 22

Round 23

Round 24

Round 25

Round 26

Round 27

Notes
A. All round 1 matches played at Millennium Stadium, as part of Magic Weekend
B. All St Helens home games in 2011 to be played at Halton Stadium
C. Game to be rescheduled for later date, due to Wigan's involvement in the 2011 World Club Challenge

See also
Super League XVI
Super League play-offs

References

External links
engage Super League website
Rugby League Project

Results